The Edict of Nantes was signed on 13 April 1598 by King Henry IV and granted the Calvinist Protestants of France, also known as Huguenots, substantial rights in the nation, which was predominantly  Catholic. In the edict, Henry aimed primarily to promote civil unity. The edict separated civil from religious unity, treated some Protestants for the first time as more than mere schismatics and heretics and opened a path for secularism and tolerance. In offering a general freedom of conscience to individuals, the edict offered many specific concessions to the Protestants, such as amnesty and the reinstatement of their civil rights, including the right to work in any field, even for the state, and to bring grievances directly to the king. It marked the end of the French Wars of Religion, which had afflicted France during the second half of the 16th century.

The Edict of St. Germain, promulgated 36 years earlier by Catherine de Médici, had granted limited tolerance to Huguenots but was overtaken by events, as it was not formally registered until after the Massacre of Vassy on 1 March 1562, which triggered the first of the French Wars of Religion.

The Edict of Fontainebleau, which revoked the Edict of Nantes in October 1685, was promulgated by Louis XIV, the grandson of Henry IV. This act drove an exodus of Protestants and increased the hostility of Protestant nations bordering France.

Background
The edict aimed primarily to end the longrunning French Wars of Religion.

King Henry IV also had personal reasons for supporting the edict. Prior to assuming the throne in 1589, he had espoused Protestantism, and he remained sympathetic to the Protestant cause. It was widely believed that he converted to Catholicism in 1593 only to secure his position as king. The edict succeeded in restoring peace and internal unity to France but pleased neither party. Catholics rejected the apparent recognition of Protestantism as a permanent element in French society and still hoped to enforce religious uniformity. Protestants aspired to full parity with Catholics, which the edict did not provide. George A. Rothrock wrote : "Toleration in France was a royal notion, and the religious settlement was dependent upon the continued support of the crown".

Re-establishing royal authority in France required internal peace, which was based on limited toleration enforced by the crown. Since royal troops could not be everywhere, Huguenots needed to be granted strictly-limited possibilities of self-defense.

Terms

The Edict of Nantes that Henry IV signed had four basic texts, including a main text made up of 92 articles that was largely based on unsuccessful peace treaties signed during the recent wars. The edict also included 56 "particular" (secret) articles dealing with Protestant rights and obligations. For example, the French state guaranteed protection of French Protestants travelling abroad from the Inquisition. "This crucifies me", protested Pope Clement VIII upon hearing of the edict. The last two parts consisted of brevets (letters patent), which contained the military clauses and pastoral clauses. Both brevets were withdrawn in 1629 by Louis XIII after a final religious civil war.

The two letters patent supplementing the edict granted the Protestants safe havens (places de sûreté), which were military strongholds such as La Rochelle, in support of which the king paid 180,000 écus a year, along with a further 150 emergency forts (places de refuge), to be maintained at the Huguenots' own expense. Such an act of toleration was unusual in Western Europe, where standard practice forced subjects to follow the religion of their ruler under the application of the principle of cuius regio, eius religio.

While it granted certain privileges to Huguenots, the edict upheld Catholicism's position as the established religion of France. Protestants gained no exemption from paying the tithe and had to respect Catholic holidays and restrictions regarding marriage. The authorities limited Protestant freedom of worship to specified geographic areas. The edict dealt only with Protestant and Catholic coexistence and made no mention of Jews or Muslims, who were offered temporary asylum in France when the Moriscos were expelled from Spain.

The original act that promulgated the edict has disappeared. The Archives Nationales in Paris preserves only the text of a shorter document modified by concessions extracted from the King by the clergy and the Parlement of Paris, which delayed ten months before finally signing and setting seals to the document in 1599. A copy of the first edict, sent for safekeeping to the Protestant Geneva, survives. The provincial parlements resisted the edict. The most recalcitrant of them was the Parlement of Rouen, which unreservedly registered the edict only in 1609.

The location of the signing is uncertain. The edict itself stated merely that it was "given at Nantes, in the month of April, in the year of Our Lord one thousand five hundred and ninety-eight". By the late 19th century the Catholic tradition cited the signing in the Maison des Tourelles, the home of the prosperous Spanish trader André Ruiz, which was destroyed by bombing during the Second World War.

Revocation

The Edict remained unaltered in effect, registered by the parlements as "fundamental and irrevocable law", with the exception of the brevets, which had been granted for a period of eight years, and were renewed by Henry in 1606 and in 1611 by Marie de Médecis, who confirmed the Edict within a week of the assassination of Henry, stilling Protestant fears of another St. Bartholomew's Day massacre. The subsidies had been reduced by degrees, as Henry gained more control of the nation. By the Peace of Montpellier in 1622, concluding a Huguenot revolt in Languedoc, the fortified Protestant towns were reduced to two, La Rochelle and Montauban. The brevets were entirely withdrawn in 1629, by Louis XIII, following the Siege of La Rochelle, in which Cardinal Richelieu blockaded the city for fourteen months.

During the remainder of Louis XIII's reign, and especially during the minority of Louis XIV, the implementation of the Edict varied year by year, voiced in declarations and orders, and in case decisions in the Council, fluctuating according to the tides of domestic politics and the relations of France with powers abroad.

In October 1685, Louis XIV, the grandson of Henry IV, renounced the Edict and declared Protestantism illegal with the Edict of Fontainebleau. This act, commonly called the 'revocation of the Edict of Nantes,' had very damaging results for France. While the wars of religion did not re-ignite, intense persecution of Protestants took place.  All Protestant ministers were given two weeks to leave the country unless they converted to Catholicism and all other Protestants were prohibited from leaving the country.  In spite of the prohibition, the renewed persecution – including many examples of torture – caused as many as 400,000 to flee France at risk of their lives. Most moved to Great Britain, Prussia, the Dutch Republic, Switzerland, South Africa and the new French colonies and the Thirteen Colonies in North America. Some even moved to Denmark, where the city of Fredericia, laid waste after the Swedish conquest in 1656, needed new settlers and a specific clause in the  city ordinance allowed other than Lutheran-Protestants to live in the city. This exodus deprived France of many of its most skilled and industrious individuals, some of whom thenceforward aided France's rivals in the Netherlands and in England. The revocation of the Edict of Nantes also further damaged the perception of Louis XIV abroad, making the Protestant nations bordering France even more hostile to his regime. Upon the revocation of the edict, Frederick William, Elector of Brandenburg issued the Edict of Potsdam, which encouraged Protestants to come to Brandenburg-Prussia.

Freedom to worship and civil rights for non-Catholics in France were not restored until the signing of the Edict of Versailles, also known as the Edict of Tolerance, by Louis XVI 102 years later, on 7 November 1787. This edict was enacted by parlement two months later, less than two years before the end of the Ancien Régime and the Declaration of the Rights of Man and Citizen of 1789 would fully eliminate religious discrimination in France.

Translation of selected passages
These are the principal and most salient provisions of the edict as promulgated in Nantes, Brittany, probably on 30 April 1598:

Henri, by the grace of God king of France and of Navarre, to all to whom these presents come, greeting:

Among the infinite benefits which it has pleased God to heap upon us, the most signal and precious is his granting us the strength and ability to withstand the fearful disorders and troubles which prevailed on our advent in this kingdom.  The realm was so torn by innumerable factions and sects that the most legitimate of all the parties was fewest in numbers.  God has given us strength to stand out against this storm; we have finally surmounted the waves and made our port of safety,—peace for our state.  For which his be the glory all in all, and ours a free recognition of his grace in making use of our instrumentality in the good work....  We implore and await from the Divine Goodness the same protection and favor which he has ever granted to this kingdom from the beginning....

We have, by this perpetual and irrevocable edict, established and proclaimed and do establish and proclaim:

I.  First, that the recollection of everything done by one party or the other between March, 1585, and our accession to the crown, and during all the preceding period of troubles, remain obliterated and forgotten, as if no such things had ever happened....

III.  We ordain that the Catholic Apostolic and Roman religion shall be restored and reëstablished in all places and localities of this our kingdom and countries subject to our sway, where the exercise of the same has been interrupted, in order that it may be peaceably and freely exercised, without any trouble or hindrance; forbidding very expressly all persons, of whatsoever estate, quality, or condition, from troubling, molesting, or disturbing ecclesiastics in the celebration of divine service, in the enjoyment or collection of tithes, fruits, or revenues of their benefices, and all other rights and dues belonging to them; and that all those who during the troubles have taken possession of churches, houses, goods or revenues, belonging to the said ecclesiastics, shall surrender to them entire possession and peaceable enjoyment of such rights, liberties, and sureties as they had before they were deprived of them....

VI.  And in order to leave no occasion for troubles or differences between our subjects, we have permitted, and herewith permit, those of the said religion called Reformed to live and abide in all the cities and places of this our kingdom and countries of our sway, without being annoyed, molested, or compelled to do anything in the matter of religion contrary to their consciences, ...  upon condition that they comport themselves in other respects according to that which is contained in this our present edict.

VII.  It is permitted to all lords, gentlemen, and other persons making profession of the said religion called Reformed, holding the right of high justice [or a certain feudal tenure], to exercise the said religion in their houses....

IX.  We also permit those of the said religion to make and continue the exercise of the same in all villages and places of our dominion where it was established by them and publicly enjoyed several and divers times in the year 1597, up to the end of the month of August, notwithstanding all decrees and judgments to the contrary....

XIII.  We very expressly forbid to all those of the said religion its exercise, either in respect to ministry, regulation, discipline, or the public instruction of children, or otherwise, in this our kingdom and lands of our dominion, otherwise than in the places permitted and granted by the present edict.

XIV.  It is forbidden as well to perform any function of the said religion in our court or retinue, or in our lands and territories beyond the mountains, or in our city of Paris, or within five leagues of the said city....

XVIII.  We also forbid all our subjects, of whatever quality and condition, from carrying off by force or persuasion, against the will of their parents, the children of the said religion, in order to cause them to be baptized or confirmed in the Catholic Apostolic and Roman Church; and the same is forbidden to those of the said religion called Reformed, upon penalty of being punished with especial severity....

XXI.  Books concerning the said religion called Reformed may not be printed and publicly sold, except in cities and places where the public exercise of the said religion is permitted.

XXII.  We ordain that there shall be no difference or distinction made in respect to the said religion, in receiving pupils to be instructed in universities, colleges, and schools; nor in receiving the sick and poor into hospitals, retreats, and public charities.

See also
 Edict of toleration
 Freedom of religion
 List of treaties
 Michel de l'Hôpital, a precursor to Henry IV's policies
 Peace of Vervins
 Edict of Torda in the Principality of Transylvania
 Warsaw Confederation (1573) in the Polish–Lithuanian Commonwealth

Notes

References

Footnotes

Sources
The source followed by most modern historians is the Huguenot refugee Élie Benoist's Histoire de l'édit de Nantes, 3 vols. (Delft, 1693–95). E.G. Léonard devotes a chapter to the Edict of Nantes in his Histoire général du protestantisme, 2 vols. (Paris) 1961:II:312–89.

Further reading
 Alcock, Antony. A history of the protection of regional cultural minorities in Europe: From the Edict of Nantes to the present day (Springer, 2000).
 Baumgartner, Frederic J. "The Catholic Opposition to the Edict of Nantes, 1598–1599." Bibliothèque d'humanisme et Renaissance 40.3 (1978): 525–36. online
 Cavendish, Richard. "The edict of Nantes." History Today 48.4 (1998): 35–35.
 Champeaud, Gregory. "The Edict of Poitiers and the Treaty of Nérac, or two steps towards the Edict of Nantes." Sixteenth Century Journal (2001): 319–34. online
 Kleinman,  Ruth. "Changing Interpretations of the Edict of Nantes: The Administrative Aspect, 1643–1661." French Historical Studies 10.4 (1978): 541–71 online
 Gerson, Noel B. The Edict of Nantes (Grosset & Dunlap, 1969).
 Lualdi, Katharine J. "Persevering in the faith: Catholic worship and communal identity in the wake of the Edict of Nantes." Sixteenth century journal (2004): 717–34. online
 Orcibal, Jean. "Louis XIV and the Edict of Nantes." in Louis XIV and Absolutism (Palgrave Macmillan, 1976) pp. 154–76.
 Parsons, Jotham, ed. The Edict of Nantes: Five Essays and a New Translation (National Huguenot Society, 1998).
 Pugh, Wilma J. "Social welfare and the Edict of Nantes: Lyon and Nimes." French Historical Studies 8.3 (1974): 349–76. online
 Sutherland, Nicola M. "The Crown, the Huguenots, and the Edict of Nantes." in The Huguenot Connection: The Edict of Nantes, Its Revocation, and Early French Migration to South Carolina (Springer, Dordrecht, 1988) pp. 28–48.
 Sutherland, Nicola Mary. "The Huguenots and the Edict of Nantes 1598–1629." in Huguenots in Britain and their French Background, 1550–1800 (Palgrave Macmillan, 1987) pp. 158–74.
 Tylor, Charles. The Huguenots in the Seventeenth Century: Including the History of the Edict of Nantes, from Its Enactment in 1598 to Its Revocation in 1685 (1892) online.
 Whelan, Ruth. Toleration and Religious Identity: The Edict of Nantes and its Implications in France, Britain and Ireland (2003)

External links

 The Edict of Nantes 
 The Edict of Nantes Manuscript and French transcription of the Edict of Nantes
 The Edict of Nantes, with its Secret Articles and Brevets, Translated by Jotham Parsons

1598 in law
History of Catholicism in France
Nantes
Religion in the Ancien Régime
French Wars of Religion
1598 in France
Religion and politics
Christianity and law in the 16th century
Law of France
Nantes
Henry IV of France
1598 in Christianity
Edicts of toleration